is a Japanese manga series written and illustrated by Yuichi Hasegawa. It was serialized in the Gakken magazine Monthly Comic Nora from 1985 to 1994. The series was adapted into two anime original video animations (OVAs): the 1987 original, fully titled  in Japan, and the 1994 remake, simply titled Maps.

Plot
Maps follows a normal Earth boy named Gen. He and his girlfriend Hoshimi meet Lipmira, a scantily-clad blonde woman from outer space, who tells Gen that he is the "mapman," meaning the map to a great treasure is coded in his genes. Gen and Hoshimi leave Earth with Lipmira to find the treasure, a quest shared by evil space people whom they are often compelled to fight against. Notable aspects of the series are the spaceships (which look like giant silver angelic women, often described as "hood ornaments") and the robot women that control them, or more precisely embody them for dealings with regular-sized life forms (Lipmira is one of these robot embodiments). Each ship and its pilot have a distinct character, from playful to evil.

Media

Manga
Maps was written and illustrated by Yuichi Hasegawa. It was serialized in the Gakken magazine Monthly Comic Nora from 1985 to 1994. A total of 17 tankōbon bound volumes were published in Japan between 1987 and 1995. Japan Media Factory re-released the manga in bunkoban format in 2003.

OVAs
Two OVAs based on Maps have been created.
The first, Maps: Densetsu no Samayoeru Seijintachi, was produced by Studio Gallop, directed by Keiji Hayakawa, written by Kenji Terada, and musically scored by Kohei Tanaka. It was released exclusively in Japan on July 17, 1987. The second, simply titled Maps, was animated by TMS Entertainment, directed by Susumu Nishizawa, written by Masaki Tsuji, and musically scored by Masahiro Kawasaki. It was released in Japan in four episodes split into two volumes on July 8, 1994 and February 24, 1995. An English version of this OVA was later licensed by ADV Films and distributed in North America.

1994-1995 OVA episodes

References

External links

  IMDB entry for original 1987 OAV
  IMDB entry for 1994 remake OAV
 (Mixed) review of 1994 OAV from Scifi.com
 (Negative) review of 1994 OAV from THEM Anime.org

1985 manga
1987 anime OVAs
1994 anime OVAs
ADV Films
Gallop (studio)
Science fiction anime and manga
Shōnen manga
TMS Entertainment